Alfredo Rodríguez y Pacheco (born 11 August 1959) is a Mexican politician affiliated with the PAN. As of 2013 he served as Senator of the LX and LXI Legislatures of the Mexican Congress representing Yucatán. He also served as Deputy during the LIX Legislature.

References

1959 births
Living people
Politicians from Yucatán (state)
Members of the Senate of the Republic (Mexico)
Members of the Chamber of Deputies (Mexico)
National Action Party (Mexico) politicians
21st-century Mexican politicians